Bangla Bachao Front (Save Bengal Front), a front of opposition parties contesting the 2001 West Bengal legislative assembly elections. The front was led by All India Trinamool Congress and also included Bharatiya Janata Party, the Jharkhand Party, the Kamtapur Peoples Party, Samata Party and a break-away group of Biplobi Bangla Congress.

The front gave support to Gorkha National Liberation Front candidates in three constituencies.

See also
Politics of West Bengal

Defunct political parties in West Bengal
2001 establishments in West Bengal
Political parties established in 2001